Eleanor de Moura (– 28 November 1706) was a Spanish noblewoman of the 17th and 18th centuries, notable for serving as Viceroy of Sicily for one month in 1677.

Her father was Francisco de Moura Corte Real, 3rd Marquis of Castelo Rodrigo and her mother was Anna Maria Moncada y Aragón. Her father had served as a viceroy of Sardinia and Catalonia, and later as governor of the Habsburg Netherlands. In 1664 Leonor married Aniello (Angelo) de Guzmàn Carafa.

When Eleanor's father died in 1675, she inherited his title of Marquise of Castel Rodrigo and Duchess of Nocera. In 1676 Aniello was named interim Viceroy of Sicily and so the couple moved into Castello a Mare, Palermo. When Aniello died on 18 April 1677, he named his widow his successor in a letter. She was sworn in before the Royal Ministers and quickly passed a large number of progressive reforms:
re-establishing the Conservatorio per le Vergini pericolanti (collegium for endangered girls), such as girls (especially orphans) who were vulnerable to exploitation and at risk of prostitution 
offering a royal dowry so poor girls could marry
re-establishing an asylum for older prostitutes
establishing the Conservatorio delle Ripentite (Collegium of the Penitents), to help prostitutes who wanted to give up their profession.
cutting taxes on men with large families
lowering the price of bread
establishing the Magistrate of Commerce

Eleanor's actions earned her the opposition of the established power-brokers of Sicily, and they were able to force her out by pointing out that the Viceroy was also the papal legate, a role that could not be fulfilled by a woman; she was dismissed, and a law was passed forbidding the viceroy from passing his role on to his wife.

Eleanor returned to Spain; in 1679 she married Carlos Homo-Dei Lasso de la Vega, second Marquis of Almonacid de los Oteros, Superior Commander of the Military Order of Christ. They had one son, who died young. When she died in 1706, her titles went to her sister Juana.

Cultural depictions

Eleanor's story is retold in the 2013 Andrea Camilleri novel The Revolution of the Moon.

References

1707 deaths
17th-century women politicians
17th-century Spanish women
17th-century viceregal rulers
18th-century Spanish women
Viceroys of Sicily